Hyperborea is a fantasy board game designed by Pierluca Zizzi.

Overview
Players each control a kingdom with unique abilities they use to build a civilization through magic, combat and exploration.

Reception
In a review of Hyperborea in Black Gate, John ONeill said "If you're familiar with epic-scale fantasy games, you know they take a lot of time to set up and play. Hyperborea skirts much of that with an intriguing "bag-building" mechanic, which simulates some of the depth of typical civilization games, but yields a shorter play time."

Reviews
 Casus Belli (v4, Issue 12 - Nov/Dec 2014)

References

External Links

Fantasy board games
Wargames introduced in the 2010s